Iversen is a Danish-Norwegian patronymic surname meaning "son of Iver", from the Old Norse personal name Ívarr. The Old Norse personal name is composed of the two elements: either ív meaning "yew tree", "bow" or Ing (an old Germanic God); and the element ar meaning "warrior" or "spear". Scandinavian immigrants to English-speaking countries often changed the spelling to Iverson in order to accommodate English orthographic rules.

People
Baard Iversen (1836–1920), Norwegian businessperson and politician
Berthel Michael Iversen (1906–1976), Danish architect in Malaysia
Bjarne Iversen (1912–1999), Norwegian cross country skier
Bjørn Iversen (born 1953), Norwegian politician for the Labour Party
Duke Iversen (1920–2011), American football player
Egil Monn-Iversen (1928–2017), Norwegian composer
Egil Iversen, Norwegian orienteering competitor 
Felix Iversen (1887–1973), Finnish mathematician and pacifist
Ivar Iversen (1914–2012), Norwegian sprint canoer
Jan Iversen (1916–1999), Norwegian politician for the Christian Democratic Party
Johannes Iversen (1904–1972), Danish palaeoecologist and plant ecologist
Jon Iversen (1889–1964), Danish actor and director
Jørgen Iversen Dyppel (1638–1683), Danish governor of St. Thomas in the Danish West Indies
Julius Iversen (1823–1900), Russian phalerist (scholar of medals)
Leif Iversen (1911–1989), Norwegian politician for the Conservative Party
Kristen Iversen, American author
Kræsten Iversen (1886–1955), Danish artist
Niels Kristian Iversen (born 1982), Danish motorcycle speedway rider
Odd Iversen (1945–2014), Norwegian soccer player
Ole Iversen (1884–1953), Norwegian gymnast, 1908 Summer Olympics 
Ragnvald Iversen (1882–1960), Norwegian linguist
Steffen Iversen (born 1976), Norwegian football player
Sverre Iversen (1879-1967),Norwegian trade unionist, civil servant and politician
Trond Iversen (born 1976), Norwegian cross country skier
Turid Iversen (born 1934), Norwegian politician for the Conservative Party

See also
Ivarson (disambiguation)

References

Danish-language surnames
Norwegian-language surnames
Patronymic surnames